Satoru Hirota (born 9 June 1973) is a Japanese professional golfer.

Hirota plays on the Japan Golf Tour, where he has won once.

Professional wins (3)

Japan Golf Tour wins (1)

Japan Golf Tour playoff record (0–1)

Japan Challenge Tour wins (1)

Other wins (1)
2013 Chushikoku Open

External links

Japanese male golfers
Japan Golf Tour golfers
Sportspeople from Yamaguchi Prefecture
1973 births
Living people